

Places and Spaces is an album by American trumpeter Donald Byrd, that was released on Blue Note in 1975.

Reception
Allmusic awarded the album with 4 stars and its review by Stephen Thomas Erlewine states: "Boasting sweeping string arrangements, sultry rhythm guitars, rubbery bass, murmuring flügelhorns, and punchy horn charts, the music falls halfway between the cinematic neo-funk of Street Lady and the proto-disco soul of Earth, Wind & Fire."

In popular culture
The song "You And Music" appeared in the video game Grand Theft Auto V, on the in-game radio station WorldWide FM.

Track listing
 "Change (Makes You Wanna Hustle)" (Larry Mizell) – 5:08
 "Wind Parade" (L. Mizell) – 6:10
 "(Fallin' Like) Dominoes" (Sigidi Bashir Abdullah, Bradley Ridgell, Harold Clayton) – 4:33
 "Places and Spaces" (L. Mizell, Fonce Mizell) – 6:19
 "You And Music" (L. Mizell, F. Mizell) – 5:22
 "Night Whistler" (James Carter, L. Mizell, F. Mizell) – 3:43
 "Just My Imagination (Running Away with Me)" (Barrett Strong, Norman Whitfield) – 4:36

Personnel 
 Donald Byrd – trumpet, flugelhorn, vocals
 George Bohanon – trombone
 Ray Brown – trumpet
 Tyree Glenn, Jr. – tenor saxophone
 James Carter – whistle
 Fonce Mizell – trumpet, clavichord, vocals, clavinet
 Larry Mizell – piano, vocals
 Craig McMullen – guitar
 John Rowin – guitar
 Skip Scarborough – piano
 Larry Dunn - synthesizer
 Chuck Rainey – bass
 Mayuto Correa – percussion, conga
 Harvey Mason – drums
 King Errisson – conga
 Kay Haith – vocals

Charts

Weekly charts

Year-end charts

Singles

References

External links 

1975 albums
Donald Byrd albums
Jazz-funk albums
Blue Note Records albums
Albums produced by the Mizell Brothers